The International Joint Conference on Artificial Intelligence (IJCAI) is the leading conference in the field of artificial intelligence. The conference series has been organized by the nonprofit IJCAI Organization since 1969, making it the oldest premier AI conference series in the world. It was held biennially in odd-numbered years from 1969 to 2015 and annually starting from 2016. More recently, IJCAI was held jointly every four years with ECAI since 2018 and PRICAI since 2020 to promote collaboration of AI researchers and practitioners. IJCAI covers a broad range of research areas in the field of AI. It is a large and highly selective conference, with only about 20% or less of the submitted papers to be accepted after peer review in 5 years leading to 2022. Lower acceptance rate usually means better quality papers and higher reputation conference.

Awards
Three research awards are given at each IJCAI conference.

 The IJCAI Computers and Thought Award is given to outstanding young scientists under the age of 35 in AI.
 The Donald E. Walker Distinguished Service Award is given to honor senior scientists for their contributions and service to the field of AI.
 The IJCAI Award for Research Excellence is given to scientists who have carried out a research program of consistently high quality throughout an entire career yielding several substantial results.

Additionally, IJCAI presents one or more Best Paper Awards at each conference to recognize the highest quality papers.

Organization
The International Joint Conferences on Artificial Intelligence Organization (IJCAI Organization) is a nonprofit organization founded in 1969 to promote science and education in the field of AI. It is the main organizer of the IJCAI conference series and is also responsible for handling related activities. The organization is also the official host for the editorial operations of the Artificial Intelligence journal (AIJ).

See also 
 The list of computer science conferences contains other academic conferences in computer science.

References

External links
 IJCAI website

Artificial intelligence conferences